9 and 11 Duke Street are grade II listed terraced townhouses in Duke Street, Marylebone, in the City of Westminster, London. The houses are on the east side of the street on the corner with Duke's Mews. They were built around 1776–1788 when the Duke of Manchester developed Manchester Square on Portman Estate land. Built of stock brick with slate roofs, they later had shop fronts added which were altered in the Victorian period. The buildings were extensively renovated in 2011–12 by Richardsons (Nyewood) Limited.

References

External links 
 

Grade II listed houses in the City of Westminster
Buildings and structures in Marylebone
Residential buildings completed in the 18th century